Joel Allen House is a historic home located near Latta, Dillon County, South Carolina. It was built in 1857, and is a two-story, frame South Carolina upcountry farmhouse. It is sheathed in weatherboard and has an interior floor plan of two rooms flanking a central hall. It features a full-width front porch supported by six square wooden columns.  Located on the property are the contributing smokehouse, wash house, commissary, stable, and barn.

It was listed on the National Register of Historic Places in 1974.

References

Houses on the National Register of Historic Places in South Carolina
Houses completed in 1857
Houses in Dillon County, South Carolina
National Register of Historic Places in Dillon County, South Carolina
1857 establishments in South Carolina